Manganesepta is a genus of sea snails, marine gastropod mollusks in the subfamily Emarginulinae  of the family Fissurellidae, the keyhole limpets.

Species
Species within the genus Manganesepta include:
 Manganesepta atiaia Simone & Cunha, 2014 
 Manganesepta hessleri McLean & Geiger, 1998

References

Zootaxa 3835(4): 437-468

External links
 McLean J.H. & Geiger D.L. (1998). New genera and species having the Fissurisepta shell form, with a generic-level phylogenetic analysis (Gastropoda: Fissurellidae). Contributions in Science, Natural History Museum of Los Angeles County, 475: 1-32

Fissurellidae
Monotypic gastropod genera